275 George Street is a  office building located on George Street, Brisbane, Australia. Completed in February 2009, it has 32 storeys. The building was developed by Charter Hall and constructed by Watpac. It was designed by Crone Partners. It stands Immediately Behind Brisbane City Hall.

The main tenant is Telstra, which occupies floors 2 - 22. Telstra's lease was the largest commercial lease in Brisbane's history. Floors 23 - 30 are occupied by QGC. Various Queensland Government departments and the Director of Public Prosecutions (Australia) also occupy Floors 16 - 20 of the building.

See also

 List of tallest buildings in Brisbane

References

External links 
 275 George Street on Emporis.com (General database of skyscrapers)
 275 George Street on SkyscraperPage.com (Diagrams of skyscrapers)

Skyscrapers in Brisbane
Office buildings in Brisbane
Office buildings completed in 2009
George Street, Brisbane
Skyscraper office buildings in Australia
2009 establishments in Australia